Siegfried Bärsch (14 February 1920 – 1 September 2008) was a German politician of the Social Democratic Party (SPD) and former member of the German Bundestag.

Life 
He won a direct mandate in the (first) federal election in 1949 in the Bremen-West constituency. He was able to defend it in the 1953 Bundestag elections and the 1957 Bundestag elections.

Literature

References

 
1920 births
2008 deaths
Members of the Bundestag for Bremen
Members of the Bundestag 1957–1961
Members of the Bundestag 1953–1957
Members of the Bundestag 1949–1953
Members of the Bundestag for the Social Democratic Party of Germany